The Great Darkened Days is a Canadian drama film, directed by Maxime Giroux and released in 2018. Set during World War II, the film centres on Philippe (Martin Dubreuil), a draft dodger from Quebec who is living as a drifter and Charlie Chaplin impersonator in the United States. Despite its setting, however, the film makes use of some deliberate anachronisms, including a scene where R.E.M.'s contemporary song "Everybody Hurts" plays on the radio.

The film's cast also includes Sarah Gadon, Cody Fern, Luzer Twersky, Romain Duris, Reda Kateb and Lise Roy.

The film premiered at the 2018 Toronto International Film Festival.

Accolades

References

External links
 
 The Great Darkened Days at Library and Archives Canada

2018 films
2018 drama films
Canadian drama films
Films directed by Maxime Giroux
French-language Canadian films
2010s Canadian films